MTV Showtown was the flagship show of MTV Canada and the successor to the previous flagship show, MTV Live which premiered on February 5, 2013. The show aired Monday through Thursday at 11pm ET and was created when MTV vacated Lives studio at Masonic Temple. The show consisted of MTV Lives main hosts, with the exception of Daryn Jones, who was replaced by Graham Chittenden.

No new episodes aired after the last week of June 2013, causing speculation that the show had been cancelled by MTV Canada. Repeated requests for information and interviews have not been responded to by MTV Canada producers, show hosts and public relations.

Set
The set located at 299 Queen Street West was designed by AKA Creative, a broadcast design firm that has worked on other Bell Media properties like Discovery Channel's Daily Planet. The design was inspired by the show's urban content and has a gritty warehouse patina. The set is currently being used by Bell Media's entertainment properties.

References

MTV (Canadian TV channel) original programming
2010s Canadian television talk shows
2013 Canadian television series debuts
2013 Canadian television series endings